The 1980–81 Northern Premier League was the fifteenth season of the Northern Premier League, a regional football league in Northern England, the northern areas of the Midlands and North Wales. The season began on 21 August 1982 and concluded on 7 May 1983.

Overview
The League featured twenty-two clubs.

Team changes
The following two clubs left the League at the end of the previous season:
Bangor City promoted to Alliance Premier League
Lancaster City relegated to North West Counties League Division One

The following two clubs joined the League at the start of the season:
Chorley promoted from Cheshire County League Division One (returning after a ten year's absence)
Hyde United promoted from Cheshire County League Division One (returning after a twelve year's absence)

League table

Results

Stadia and locations

Cup Results
Challenge Cup:Burton Albion 2–1 Macclesfield TownPresident's Cup:Kings Lynn 3–2 Burton AlbionNorthern Premier League Shield: Between Champions of NPL Premier Division and Winners of the NPL Cup.

Burton Albion 2–0 Gateshead

End of the season
At the end of the fifteenth season of the Northern Premier League, Gateshead applied to join the Alliance Premier League and was successful.

Promotion and relegationThe following four clubs left the League at the end of the season:Gateshead promoted to Alliance Premier League
King's Lynn transferred to Southern League Premier Division
Tamworth demoted and transferred to Southern League Midland Division
Netherfield relegated to North West Counties League Division OneThe following four clubs joined the League the following season:'
Barrow relegated from Alliance Premier League
Stafford Rangers relegated from Alliance Premier League
Horwich RMI promoted from North West Counties League Division One
Rhyl promoted from North West Counties League Division One

References

External links
 Northern Premier League official website
 Northern Premier League tables at RSSSF
 Football Club History Database

Northern Premier League seasons
6